is a professional Japanese baseball player and coach. He pitched for the Tokyo Yakult Swallows from 2005 through 2018, and has been a pitching coach for the Swallows since the 2019 season.

Matsuoka played the one season with the Waikiki BeachBoys of the now defunct Hawaii Winter Baseball league, an MLB off-season developmental league that sought to develop Japanese players much like the Arizona Fall League.

Matsuoka was picked up by the Swallows in 2005 as a pre-round draft pick from Kyushu Tokai University.

References

External links

 NPB.com

1982 births
Living people
Baseball people from Kumamoto Prefecture
Japanese expatriate baseball players in the United States
Nippon Professional Baseball pitchers
Yakult Swallows players
Tokyo Yakult Swallows players
Japanese baseball coaches
Nippon Professional Baseball coaches
Waikiki Beach Boys players
People from Tamana, Kumamoto